Anton Vladimirovich Slepyshev ( born 13 May 1994) is a Russian professional ice hockey forward for CSKA Moscow of the Kontinental Hockey League (KHL). He previously played for the Edmonton Oilers of the National Hockey League.

Playing career
Slepyshev was selected first overall in the 2011 KHL Junior Draft by Metallurg Novokuznetsk. Midway through the 2012–13 season, his second in the Kontinental Hockey League, he moved from Metallurg to Salavat Yulaev Ufa. After the Oilers selected him in the third round (88th overall) of the 2013 NHL Entry Draft, Slepyshev remained in Russia to continue his development with Salavat.

On 27 May 2015, the Oilers announced they had signed Slepyshev to a three-year entry-level contract.

At the conclusion of his entry-level contract with the Oilers following the 2017–18 season, Slepyshev was tendered a qualifying offer to retain his rights. As a restricted free agent, Slepyshev opted not to sign with the Oilers, opting to return to Russia and sign a two-year contract with premier club, CSKA Moscow of the KHL on July 2, 2018.

International play

On 23 January 2022, Slepyshev was named to the roster to represent Russian Olympic Committee athletes at the 2022 Winter Olympics.

Career statistics

Regular season and playoffs

International

Awards and honors

See also
List of first overall KHL draft picks

References

External links
 

1994 births
Living people
Bakersfield Condors players
HC CSKA Moscow players
Edmonton Oilers draft picks
Edmonton Oilers players
Kuznetskie Medvedi players
Metallurg Novokuznetsk players
Sportspeople from Penza
Russian ice hockey left wingers
Salavat Yulaev Ufa players
Tolpar Ufa players
Ice hockey players at the 2022 Winter Olympics
Medalists at the 2022 Winter Olympics
Olympic silver medalists for the Russian Olympic Committee athletes
Olympic medalists in ice hockey
Olympic ice hockey players of Russia